

Reef dive sites
In the context of recreational diving, a reef may be a coral reef or a bottom of predominantly consolidated inorganic material, like rocky reef, and in the broader sense includes artificial structures and even ships sunk as artificial reefs. 

Reef diving regions are geographical regions of arbitrary size known for including more than one named reef dive site, while a reef dive site is a specific part of a reef known by a name, which recreational divers visit to dive.

Reef diving regions

Reef dive sites
  
 
 
 
 
 
 Underwater artworks

Cave dive sites 
 
Many cave dive sites are fresh water, but there are some that are sea water and a few that are partly fresh and partly sea water, and these may have a distinct halocline. 

 
 
  
  
 

Caves with exclusively or mainly fresh water
 
 s

Blue holes

Freshwater dive sites

Flooded quarries 

 
 Dorothea Quarry, Nantlle Valley, Gwynedd, North Wales. 
 Dosthill quarry, near Tamworth, Staffordshire
 Dutch Springs, Bethlehem, Pennsylvania
  

 National Diving and Activity Centre, at Tidenham, Gloucestershire
 Stoney Cove, between Stoney Stanton and Sapcote in Leicestershire

Wreck diving regions 
Wreck diving regions: Regions known for having more than one shipwreck used as a recreational dive site:
  
 
  
  
  
 
  
 
  
  
  
  
 
 List of shipwrecks in the Thunder Bay National Marine Sanctuary

Wreck diving sites

A

B

C

D

E

F

G

H

I

J

K

L

M

N

O

P

Q

R

S

T

U

V

W

Y

Z

External links 

 

Underwater diving
Underwater diving